Patricia Harras, sometimes credited as Patti Harras, is a Canadian actress from Winnipeg, Manitoba. She is most noted for her regular role as Julia Osborne in the television series Jake and the Kid, for which she won the Gemini Award for Best Actress in a Continuing Leading Dramatic Role at the 12th Gemini Awards in 1998.

She was also subsequently nominated for Best Performance by an Actress in a Guest Role in a Dramatic Series at the 13th Gemini Awards, for an appearance in Cold Squad. She has also appeared in the television series The Marshal, Supernatural and Spooksville, and in the films Dawn Anna, Fear Island and Fantastic Four: Rise of the Silver Surfer.

Filmography

Film

Television

References

External links

20th-century Canadian actresses
21st-century Canadian actresses
Canadian film actresses
Canadian stage actresses
Canadian television actresses
Actresses from Winnipeg
Best Actress in a Drama Series Canadian Screen Award winners
Living people
Year of birth missing (living people)